Smooth Sailing is an album by the saxophonist Arnett Cobb recorded in 1959 for the Prestige label and released in 1960.

Reception

The Allmusic review awarded the album 3 stars and stated: "Arnett Cobb's solos are typically emotional and generally exciting during the fine set".

Track listing 
All compositions by Arnett Cobb except where noted
 "Charmaine" (Erno Rapee, Lew Pollack) - 4:23  
 "Cobb's Mob" (George Duvivier) - 4:44  
 "I Don't Stand a Ghost of a Chance with You" (Bing Crosby, Ned Washington, Victor Young) - 4:44  
 "Let's Split" - 3:44  
 "Blues Around Dusk" (Osie Johnson) - 8:18  
 "Smooth Sailing" - 5:01  
 "(I'm Left with the) Blues in My Heart" (Irving Mills, Benny Carter) - 5:36

Personnel 
 Arnett Cobb - tenor saxophone
 Buster Cooper - trombone
 Austin Mitchell - organ
 George Duvivier - bass
 Osie Johnson - drums

References 

Arnett Cobb albums
1960 albums
Albums produced by Esmond Edwards
Albums recorded at Van Gelder Studio
Prestige Records albums